Turning Mecard (a transliteration) is a South Korean aeni which is a part of the toyline and media franchise of the same name developed for toy company Sonokong by Choirock (Sonokong's multimedia production arm). The series was produced for Choirock by Heewon Entertainment, and was animated by Paprika Entertainment and Production Reve.

The series was followed by Turning Mecard W, which was aired between May 2016 and September 2017 in South Korea, then followed by a soft reboot titled Turning Mecard R in September 2017 and a spin-off titled Dino Mecard in November 2017.

Cast

Release

South Korea
Turning Mecard premiered on 3 February 2015 on KBS2. Initially, it aired on Tuesdays until episode 30 (11 August 2015), but it moved to Fridays since episode 31 (21 August 2015). The show's finale aired on 5 February 2016.

English-speaking areas
There are two existing English dubs for Turning Mecard.

One English version of Turning Mecard was produced for Choirock and Sonokong by BTI Studios Hong Kong. This version, however, does not credit the voice actors, translator, voice director and the recording studio on screen. The television channels that broadcast this version include Teletoon and Cartoon Network in Canada (premiering there on May 28 and June 4, 2017, respectively), 9Go! in Australia (premiered on 12 June 2017), Okto in Singapore (premiered on 5 May 2018), TV3 in Malaysia (premiered on 5 June 2018) and Cartoon Network in the Philippines (premiered on 15 December 2018).

The other version, simply titled Mecard, was produced by Studiopolis for Mattel, which released it on their Mecard website and through the Mattel Action YouTube channel beginning on January 26, 2018. It was also streamed on Toon Goggles. In Mattel's web release, each full episode is split into two parts. A 22-minute version of this dub aired on the syndicated KidsClick programming block in the United States from June 16, 2018 to January 20, 2019. This dub was cancelled after 26 half hour episodes.

Reception
Turning Mecard toys became a fad in its native South Korea, helping propel Sonokong's stock price from ₩2,980 to a peak of ₩8,750 in 2015. The brand accounted for roughly 80% of the company's record-breaking ₩125 billion revenue that year. However, by 2017 sales for Mecard toys had slowed significantly.

Turning Mecard W: The Revival of Black Mirror ranked as the fifth highest-grossing film in South Korea in its weekend of release. The movie eventually grossed a total of ₩3.1 billion.

See also 
 aeni

References

External links
 Turning Mecard at KBS 
 Turning Mecard at Teletoon
 Turning Mecard at 9Now (Australia only)
 Mattel Action's  (available in Canada, Hong Kong, Pakistan, Taiwan, Singapore and Malaysia only)
 Mattel Action's  (not available in Australia, New Zealand, Latin America, the Caribbean, India and Taiwan)

2010s South Korean animated television series
South Korean children's animated action television series
South Korean children's animated adventure television series
South Korean children's animated science fantasy television series
Anime-influenced Western animated television series